Col de la Quillane is a mountain pass in the Pyrenees on the border between La Llagonne and Matemale in Pyrénées-Orientales.

The Col de la Quillane marks the boundary of the watershed, with the Aude river on one side and the Têt river on the other.

It is from the Col de la Quillane that the businessman and Pyrenees explorer Prosper Auriol, and his friends, made the first skiing ever in the Pyrenees, on 29 January 1901.

At the Col de la Quillane nowadays can be found the small ski resort of La Quillane.

See also
 List of mountain passes

References

Mountain passes of the Pyrenees
Mountain passes of Occitania (administrative region)